Lashkarabad may refer to:
Lashkarabad, Alborz
Shekarabad, Delfan, Lorestan
Shokrabad, Tehran